The Still Life is a 2007 film written, produced, and directed by Joel A. Miller. The feature film is a drama that tells the story of fictitious artist Julian Lamont.  The film stars Jason Barry, Rachel Miner, & Terry Moore (actress).  

Miller stated the main character Julian Lamont's story and his tumultuous struggles were developed while Miller was on the road touring with the band Stone Temple Pilots. The main character was modeled off of his perceptions of Scott Weiland at the time.  Miller wrote much of the script while traveling with the band as a roadie.  Miller made the film with his earnings while working in the music industry with a budget of 24 thousand dollars.

The Film screened throughout the country winning the bronze medal at the Park City Film Music Festival.  After a successful festival circuit run it was released by Warner Bros..

Synopsis
Julian Lamont (Jason Barry) struggles to pick up the pieces of his tattered life. A reclusive alcoholic, Julian creates a new art genre called Destructionism, and his work soon catapults him into the limelight. As his success in the art world grows, Julian loses touch with the artist he truly desires to be, and his personal life tailspins out of control.

Cast
 Jason Barry as Julian Lamont
 Rachel Miner as Robin 
 Terry Moore as Mrs. Stratford
 Don S. Davis as Mr. Fernot
 Robert Miano as Mr. Rifken
 Holly Fields as Stephanie
 Angel Boris as Cindy
 Jonathan Davis as Liquor Store Clerk
 Josh Todd as Hutch
 Razaaq Adoti as Rodney
 Patricia Belcher as Meter Maid
 Michael Callen as Resident
 Domenica Cameron-Scorsese as Self
 Grant Cramer as the Gnome Guy
 Shay Duffin as the Bartender
 Dean Dinning as Art Critic
 Gita Hall as Self
 Doug Carrion as Museum Security Guard
 Delaney Bramlett as Self
 Kato Kaelin as Photographer
 Yolanda King as Self/Art Buyer
 Rae'Ven Larrymore Kelly as Self/Art Buyer
 Tommy Lister Jr. as Self/Art Buyer
 William McNamara as Teacher
 Angelo Moore as Sax Player
 Joel Michaely as Robert
 Danny Pintauro as Stefan
 Al Snow as Art Buyer
 Louise Post as Lounge Singer
 Dizzy Reed as Piano Player
 Kim Shattuck as Museum Curator
 Matthew Nelson as Guitar Player
 Daize Shayne as Autograph Seeker

Soundtracks
 ,

Bringing many of the people involved with the production onto the soundtrack, the film featured new music by Dizzy Reed, Dean Dinning, Joel A. Miller, Adrian Young, Doug Carrion, Pete Finestone, Darius Rucker, Dave Sabo, Louise Post, Angelo Moore, Delaney Bramlett, Matthew Nelson, and Sonny Mone. The soundtrack was released in conjunction with the film through Warner Bros. in 2007.

References

External links
 
 
 http://www.independent.com/news/2007/sep/06/joel-millers-still-life-toads-dean-dinning-comes-o/ Santa Barbara Independent
 http://prod-www.tcm.com/tcmdb/title/643751/the-still-life#overview/ Turner Classic Movies
 https://www.encyclopedia.com/arts/culture-magazines/still-life
 https://mubi.com/films/the-still-life
 https://letterboxd.com/film/the-still-life/
 https://www.shockya.com/news/2007/05/14/the-still-life-gets-distribution/

2007 films